Tian Yunzhang (born May 1, 1945, in Tianjin, China) is a Chinese  calligrapher and a calligraphy professor of Nankai University.

References 

1945 births
Living people
Artists from Tianjin
Academic staff of Nankai University
People's Republic of China calligraphers
Educators from Tianjin
Writers from Tianjin